Humanda Ka Mayor!: Bahala Na ang Diyos (lit. "Get Ready Mayor!: It's Up to God") is a 1993 Philippine crime drama film directed by Carlo J. Caparas and written by Caparas, Gigi Javier Alfonso, and Efren Montano. The film is based on the murders of Eileen Sarmenta and Allan Gomez and the arrest of Calauan Mayor Antonio Sanchez.

Released on December 2, 1993, the film was a box office success.

Cast 
Aga Muhlach
Kris Aquino 
Nida Blanca
Luis Gonzales 
Dick Ysrael as Mayor Miguel Beltran (based on Mayor Antonio Sanchez)
Tommy Abuel
Robert Arevaldo
Luz Valdez
Sunshine Cruz as Mary Eileen Sarmenta 
Jeffrey Santos as Allan Gomez 
Romy Diaz
Bomber Moran
Ramil Rodriguez
Ali Sotto
Gigi Javier Alfonso
Ernie Forte
Ernie David
Nonoy de Guzman
Eddie Tuazon
Boy Antiporda
Manny Rodriguez
Ronnie Francisco
Rey Fabian
Tony Tacorda

Production 
The film is loosely based on the rape-slaying of Eileen Sarmenta and supposed boyfriend Allan Gomez by then former mayor Antonio Sanchez of Calauan, Laguna and his henchmen and later convicted of the crime with a total jail term of 360 years.

Release
Humanda Ka Mayor! was released on December 2, 1993.

Box office
The film was a box office success, grossing ₱4 million on its opening day alone.

References

External links
 

1993 films
1990s crime action films
Filipino-language films
Films shot in Cavite
Philippine action films
Philippine crime drama films
1990s Tagalog-language films
Films directed by Carlo J. Caparas